Arnaud Vachon is a Canadian actor from Saint-Isidore, Quebec. He is most noted for his performance in the film The Vinland Club (Le Club Vinland), for which he received a Prix Iris nomination for Revelation of the Year at the 23rd Quebec Cinema Awards in 2021.

References

External links

21st-century Canadian male actors
Canadian male film actors
Canadian male child actors
Male actors from Quebec
French Quebecers
Living people
People from Chaudière-Appalaches
Year of birth missing (living people)